Schizozygia is a monotypic genus of plant in the family Apocynaceae found in tropical Africa and the Comoros. , Plants of the World Online recognises the single species Schizozygia coffaeoides.

Its fragrant flowers feature a creamy-yellow corolla. Its habitat is forests from sea level to  altitude. Local medicinal uses include as a treatment for eye inflammation, sores and ringworm-infected skin. Schizozygia coffaeoides is native to the Democratic Republic of the Congo, Somalia, Kenya, Tanzania, Angola, Malawi and the Comoros.

References

Plants used in traditional African medicine
Flora of the Democratic Republic of the Congo
Flora of Somalia
Flora of Kenya
Flora of Tanzania
Flora of Angola
Flora of Malawi
Flora of the Comoros
Monotypic Apocynaceae genera
Rauvolfioideae
Taxa named by Henri Ernest Baillon